Kurt Georg Hugo Thomas (25 May 1904 – 31 March 1973) was a German composer, conductor and music educator.

Life 
Thomas was born in Tönning. Completing with the Abitur on 21 April 1922, he studied law and music at the Leipzig University. He completed his studies in 1925 and worked as a lecturer of music theory at the Landeskonservatorium der Musik zu Leipzig. He composed a Mass in A minor as his Op. 1, which earned him the Beethoven Prize of the Preußische Akademie der Künste in 1927. The choir was named "Kurt-Thomas-Kantorei" and toured in Germany.

Thomas was professor of choral conducting at the Akademische Hochschule für Musik in Berlin from Von 1934 to 1939. During this time, he composed a cantata for the Olympic Games in Berlin in 1936, the Kantate zur Olympiade 1936 (Olympic Cantata 1936) as an entry for a competition of the Reichsmusikkammer, which won a silver medal. He became a member of the NSDAP in 1940, number 7.463.935.

From 1939 to 1945, Thomas he was in Frankfurt director of the Musisches Gymnasium Frankfurt (High school with main courses in music). Among his students were choral conductors Heinz Hennig and Hans-Joachim Rotzsch, composers Alfred Koerppen, Wolfgang Pasquay, Wolfgang Schoor, Siegfried Strohbach, Paul Kuhn, and organist .

From 1945, Thomas was Kantor (church musician) at the Dreikönigskirche in Frankfurt. From 1947 to 1955, Thomas was professor of conducting, especially choral conducting, at the Nordwestdeutsche Musikakademie, now the Hochschule für Musik Detmold. He kept his position at the Dreikönigskirche to 1957.

Thomas was the Thomaskantor, the cantor of the Thomanerchor, from 1957 to 1960. He succeeded Günther Ramin on 1 April 1957. When a planned tour of the Thomanerchor to West Germany was cancelled in 1960, he left the post. From 1961, he conducted the concerts of the choir . Simultaneously, he founded in Frankfurt the concert choir Frankfurter Kantorei, mostly of members of the Kantorei of the Dreikönigskirche, and conducted the choir to 1969.

Thomas was also professor at the Musikhochschule Lübeck from 1965. He died in Bad Oeynhausen.

Work 
As a composer, Thomas focused on choral music. He returned to a cappella music which he combined with late-romantic musical idioms. Works such as his Messe in a-Moll (Mass in A minor of 1924 and Markuspassion (St. Mark Passion) of 1927 were part of a reformed music in the Protestant churches after 1920. He published a book on choral conducting in three volumes, Lehrbuchs der Chorleitung, which was reprinted in 1991, revised and expanded.

 Mass in A minor for choir a cappella, Op. 1 (1924)
 Violin Sonata in E minor, Op. 2
 Markuspassion (1927)
 Psalm 137 (An den Wassern zu Babel saßen wir) for four-part choirs a cappella (1928)
 Weihnachtsoratorium, Op. 17 (1930/31); premiered 4 December 1931 by 
 Organ Variations, Op. 19, on "Es ist ein Schnitter, heißt der Tod" (1932)
 Motets, Op. 21, including
 Fürwahr, er trug unsre Krankheit
 Gott wird abwischen alle Tränen
 Jauchzet Gott alle Lande
 Herr, sei mir gnädig
 Herr, ich habe lieb die Stätte deines Hauses
 Von der ewigen Liebe
 Cantata for the Olympic Games, Op. 28 (1936)
 Festliche Musik für Orgel, Op. 35
 Saat und Ernte, Op. 36 (oratorio)
 Eichendorff-Kantate, Op. 37 (1938)
 Drei Abendlieder for mezzo-soprano and piano after  (1943)

Recordings 
Thomas recorded Bach's Christmas Oratorio twice, with choir and orchestra of the Detmold Akademy in 1951, and with the Thomanerchor in 1958, with the Gewandhausorchester and soloists Agnes Giebel, Marga Höffgen, Josef Traxel and Dietrich Fischer-Dieskau. He conducted several Bach cantatas with the Thomanerchor in a series Bach Made in Germany, including the first recording of Hermann Prey as the bassist in Ich will den Kreuzstab gerne tragen, BWV 56, and several secular cantatas.

Literature 
 : Kurt Thomas. Studien zu Leben und Werk. Merseburger, Kassel 1989, .
 Werner Heldmann: Musisches Gymnasium Frankfurt am Main 1939 – 1945. Eine Schule im Spannungsfeld von pädagogischer Verantwortung, künstlerischer Freiheit und politischer Doktrin. Peter Lang, Frankfurt 2004, .
 Manfred Kluge (ed.): Chorerziehung und neue Musik. Für Kurt Thomas zum 65. Geburtstag. Breitkopf & Härtel, Wiesbaden 1969.

References

External links 
 
 
 
 Musensöhne documentary about Kurt Thomas and the Musisches Gymnasium Frankfurt am Main (1939–45)] (90 minutes), WDR 2012
 Kurt Thomas (Conductor, Thomaskantor, Composer) Bach Cantatas Website
 Kurt Thomas (1904-1973), a remarkable Thomas Kantor and Bach conductor authenticsound.org
 

1904 births
1973 deaths
People from Tönning
Olympic silver medalists in art competitions
Thomaskantors
Bach conductors
Academic staff of the Hochschule für Musik Detmold
20th-century conductors (music)
20th-century German composers
Medalists at the 1936 Summer Olympics
Olympic competitors in art competitions